Irham Dmoo`i  (Pity My Tears) is a 1954 Egyptian drama film directed by Henry Barakat. It stars Shukry Sarhan, Rushdy Abaza, and Faten Hamama. The film received awards from the Egyptian Ministry of Guidance and the Lebanese film ceremony.

Plot 
Faten Hamama plays Amal, whose father loses most of his money and almost goes bankrupt. She gets abandoned by her fiancé. The owner of a nearby factory steps up and offers to help her father until his conditions get better. Amal marries this man, but their life together as a couple turns out to be boring. Amal, who wasn't very excited about their relationship initially, slowly discovers her husband's good qualities, and their life turns into a happy one.

References

External links 

1954 films
1950s Arabic-language films
1954 drama films
Egyptian drama films
Egyptian black-and-white films